The Greenwell Glacier is a major tributary glacier,  long, draining northwest between the Mirabito Range and the Everett Range to enter Lillie Glacier below Mount Works, in northwest Victoria Land, Antarctica. This geographical feature was first mapped by the United States Geological Survey from surveys and from U.S. Navy aerial photography, 1960–63, and was so named by the Advisory Committee on Antarctic Names for Commander Martin D. Greenwell, U.S. Navy, Commander of Antarctic Squadron Six (VX-6), 1961–62. The glacier lies situated on the Pennell Coast, a portion of Antarctica lying between Cape Williams and Cape Adare.

See also
 List of glaciers in the Antarctic
 Glaciology

References

Glaciers of Pennell Coast